The West Pier is a pier in Brighton, England.

West Pier may also refer to:
 The West Pier, a novel by Patrick Hamilton and part of the Gorse Trilogy
 West Pier (play), by Bernard-Marie Koltès